Johann Christoph von Ponickau (21 March 1652 – 31 October 1726), was a counselor and chamberlain at the Dresden court of the elector of Saxony.

Early life
Ponickau was born on 21 March 1652 into the  family. He owned several estates, including the Rittergut in Pomßen near Leipzig.

Career
He was a counselor and chamberlain at the Dresden court of the elector of Saxony, who was at the same time King of Poland (Königlich-polnischer und kurfürstlich-sächsischer Rat).

Personal life
Ponickau was married to Eleonora Elisabeth von Bernstein. One of their children:

 Johanne Eleonore Caroline von Poickau, who married  in Altenburg on 14 December 1727.

Ponickau died in Pomßen on 31 October 1726 at age 74.

References 

1652 births
1726 deaths
18th-century German civil servants
Privy counsellors
Chamberlains
People from Eilenburg